Santo Antônio do Grama is a municipality in the state of Minas Gerais in Brazil. The population is 3,886 (2020 est.) in an area of 130.21 km².

The city became prominent due to the mining accident in March 2018 where a mine piping from Anglo American plc leaked more than 300 tons of ore pulp to the local river, halting the water supply to the population.

References

External links
 Santo Antônio do Grama on citybrazil.com.br 
 Santo Antônio do Grama on Explorevale 

Municipalities in Minas Gerais